Majesty (also known as Metalforce between 2008 and 2011) is a German heavy metal band.

History 
Majesty call their music True Metal (which is a common term in the Heavy Metal scene for traditional heavy metal or power metal with idealized, traditional and fantasy based lyrics and stage-appearance) and the band is usually dressed in leather. The band leader Tarek Maghary also organizes a festival called Keep It True. It is named after a song from Metal Force and features traditional heavy metal bands, often reunions or rare appearances of US metal bands.

Tarek Maghary is also the author of the Dawnrider project, a metal concept album featuring many other musicians like Rob Rock, Ross The Boss, Michael Seifert (Rebellion). Other contributors are from Manilla Road, Wizard, Helstar and Paragon.

During Magic Circle Festival 2008 the band announced that they had changed their name from "Majesty" to "Metal Force". However, in 2011 they announced that they were once again continuing as "Majesty".

In 2013 they released a new album, Banners High and guitarist Robin Hadamovsky entered the band.

In March 2015, the band's ninth studio album, Generation Steel, was released via NoiseArt Records. A single and music video for "Hawks Will Fly" was released on 28 February.

Members

Current members 
 Tarek Maghary – vocals, keyboards, (guitars 1997–2003)
 Robin Hadamovsky – guitars
 Alex Voß – bass
 Jan Raddatz – drums
 Emanuel Knorr – guitar

Past members 
 Tristan Visser – guitar
 Marcus Bielenberg – bass
 Björn Daigger – rhythm guitar
 Christian Münzer – lead guitar
 Chris Heun – live bass (on fall 2004 tour)
 Udo Keppner – guitars
 Martin Hehn – bass
 Markus Pruszydlo – keyboards
 Andreas Moll – keyboards
 Ingo Zadravo – drums
 Rolf Munkes – lead guitar

Timeline

Metalforce Era

Discography 
 Keep It True (2000)
 Sword & Sorcery (2002)
 Reign in Glory (2003)
 Metal Law (live album, 2004)
 Hellforces (2006)
 Metalforce (2009) (as Metalforce)
 Own the Crown (compilation, 2011)
 Thunder Rider (2013)
 Banners High (2013)
 Generation Steel (2015)
 Rebels (2017)
 Legends (2019)
 Back to Attack (2023)

References

External links 
 Official website
 Myspace page
 Keep It True festival
 Dawnrider homepage

German power metal musical groups
German heavy metal musical groups